The 2007–08 network television schedule for the six major English language commercial broadcast networks in the United States. The schedule covers prime time hours from September 2007 through August 2008. The schedule is followed by a list per network of returning series, new series, and series canceled after the 2006–07 season. The schedule was affected by the 2007–08 Writers Guild of America strike. After that, the next disruption to the networks' primetime schedules would not occur until the 2020–21 season, whose network schedules were affected by the suspension of film and television productions as a result of the COVID-19 pandemic.

NBC was the first to announce its fall schedule on May 14, 2007, followed by ABC on May 15, CBS on May 16, Fox and The CW on May 17, and MyNetworkTV on August 24, 2007.

This was the first TV season where Nielsen Media Research kept track of DVR ratings (live plus same day; C3; live plus 7)

PBS is not included; member stations have local flexibility over most of their schedules and broadcast times for network shows may vary.

New series are highlighted in bold.

All times are U.S. Eastern and Pacific Time (except for some live sports or events). Subtract for one hour for Central, Mountain, Alaska and Hawaii-Aleutian times.

All NBC programming from August 8, 2008 to August 24, 2008 was pre-empted for coverage of the 2008 Summer Olympics in Beijing.

Each of the 30 highest-rated shows is listed with its rank and rating in parenthesis (#rank / rating), as determined by Nielsen Media Research.

Legend

Sunday

 
Extreme Makeover: Home Edition aired two-hour episodes on January 13 through January 27.
Viva Laughlin aired two episodes (the pilot on October 18 and the 2nd episode on October 21st) before it was cancelled.

Monday

NBC aired Clash of the Choirs for four consecutive nights starting on December 17, 2007.
ABC aired Duel for six nights for the week starting on December 17, 2007.
American Gladiators premiered Sunday, January 6, 2008 at 9:00PM Eastern/8:00PM Central before moving to Mondays at 8:00PM Eastern/7:00PM Central.
Terminator: The Sarah Connor Chronicles premiered Sunday, January 13, 2008 at 8:00PM Eastern/7:00PM Central before moving to Mondays at 9:00PM Eastern/8:00PM Central.
Season 7 of 24 was supposed to start in 2008, but delayed to 2009 due to the WGA strike.

Tuesday

According to Jim premiered on January 1, 2008 with two 30 minute episodes. Then on January 9, 2008 it only aired one episode for the night.
One Tree Hill premiered on January 8, 2008 with a two-hour premiere.
American Idol premiered on January 15 to 16, 2008 with two hour episodes each night.
NBC aired quarterlife on February 26, 2008. After the first episode failed to earn the ratings the network had hoped, NBC announced that the series would be canceled after airing only one episode. Its remaining episodes would air on sibling channel Bravo.
Miss Guided aired a "sneak-peek" on Tuesday, March 18, 2008 following Dancing with the Stars at 10:30PM Eastern/9:30PM Central. It then moved to its regular timeslot on March 20 at 8:00PM Eastern/7:00PM Central with back to back episodes filling in for Ugly Betty through April 3.
 On April 8, 2008, CBS premiered Secret Talents of the Stars at 10PM Eastern/9PM Central. The show was cancelled the following day.

Wednesday

 American Idol premiered on January 15, 2008 and January 16, 2008 with two hour episodes each night.
Crowned: The Mother of All Pageants premiered on December 12, 2007 at 9:00PM Eastern/8:00PM Central before moving to Wednesdays at 8:00PM Eastern/7:00PM Central.
 Law & Order had a two-hour season premiere (two episodes) on January 2, 2008.
 Supernanny aired back to back episodes on January 2, 2008.

Thursday

Reaper moved to 9:00PM Eastern/8:00PM Central on February 28, 2008, replacing Supernatural.
Miss Guided aired a "sneak-peek" on Tuesday March 18, 2008 following Dancing with the Stars at 10:30PM Eastern/9:30PM Central. It then moved to its regular timeslot on March 20 at 8:00PM Eastern/7:00PM Central with back to back episodes filling in for Ugly Betty through April 3.

Friday

 Amne$ia premiered on February 22, 2008 at 9:00PM Eastern/8:00PM Central, before moving to its regular timeslot on February 29, 2008 at 8:00PM Eastern/7:00PM Central.

Saturday

By network

ABC

Returning series
20/20
ABC Saturday Movie of the Week
According to Jim
America's Funniest Home Videos
The Bachelor
The Bachelorette
Boston Legal
Brothers & Sisters
Dancing with the Stars
Desperate Housewives
Extreme Makeover: Home Edition
Grey's Anatomy
Just for Laughs
Lost
Men in Trees
The Mole
Notes from the Underbelly
October Road
Primetime
Saturday Night Football
Supernanny
Ugly Betty
Wife Swap
The Wonderful World of Disney

New series
Big Shots
Carpoolers
Cashmere Mafia *
Cavemen
Dance Machine *
Dance War: Bruno vs. Carrie Ann *
Dirty Sexy Money
Duel *
Eli Stone *
Here Come the Newlyweds *
High School Musical: Get in the Picture *
Hopkins *
I Survived a Japanese Game Show *
Miss Guided *
Oprah's Big Give *
Private Practice
Primetime: What Would You Do? *
Pushing Daisies
Samantha Who?
Wanna Bet? *
Wipeout *
Women's Murder Club

Not returning from 2006–07:
Big Day
Day Break
Extreme Makeover
The Ex-Wives Club
Fast Cars and Superstars
Fat March
George Lopez
The Great American Dream Vote
Help Me Help You
i-Caught
In Case of Emergency
The Knights of Prosperity
Masters of Science Fiction
National Bingo Night
The Next Best Thing
The Nine
Set for Life
Shaq's Big Challenge
Show Me the Money
Six Degrees
Traveler
What About Brian

CBS

Returning series
48 Hours Mystery
60 Minutes
The Amazing Race
Big Brother
Cold Case
CSI: Crime Scene Investigation
CSI: Miami
CSI: NY
Criminal Minds
Ghost Whisperer
How I Met Your Mother
Jericho
NCIS
The New Adventures of Old Christine
Numb3rs
Power of 10
Rules of Engagement
Shark
Survivor
Two and a Half Men
The Unit
Without a Trace

New series
The Big Bang Theory
Cane
Flashpoint *
Greatest American Dog *
Kid Nation
Million Dollar Password *
Moonlight
Secret Talents of the Stars *
Swingtown *
Viva Laughlin
Welcome to The Captain *

Not returning from 2006–07:
3 lbs
Armed & Famous
The Class
Close to Home
The King of Queens
Smith

The CW

Returning series
America's Next Top Model
Beauty and the Geek
Everybody Hates Chris
The Game
Girlfriends
One Tree Hill
Pussycat Dolls Present: The Search For the Next Doll
Smallville
Supernatural
WWE SmackDown

New series
Aliens in America
Crowned: The Mother of All Pageants
CW Now
Farmer Wants a Wife *
Gossip Girl
Life Is Wild
Online Nation
Reaper

Not returning from 2006–07:
7th Heaven
All of Us
Gilmore Girls
Hidden Palms
Reba
Runaway
Veronica Mars (revived to Hulu in 2019)

Fox

Returning series
America's Most Wanted
American Dad!
American Idol
Are You Smarter than a 5th Grader?
Bones
COPS
Don't Forget the Lyrics!
Family Guy
Hell's Kitchen
House
King of the Hill
NFL on Fox
The OT
Prison Break
The Simpsons
So You Think You Can Dance
Talkshow with Spike Feresten
'Til Death

New series
Back to You
Canterbury's Law *
K-Ville
Kitchen Nightmares
Nashville
New Amsterdam *
The Moment of Truth *
The Next Great American Band
The Return of Jezebel James *
Terminator: The Sarah Connor Chronicles *
Unhitched *
When Women Rule the World

Not returning from 2006–07:
24 (returned for 2008–09)
Drive
Happy Hour
Justice
Nanny 911 (Moved to CMT)
The O.C.
The Rich List
Standoff
Vanished
The War at Home
The Wedding Bells
The Winner

MyNetworkTV

Returning series
Breaking the Magician's Code: Magic's Biggest Secrets Finally Revealed (moved from Fox)
IFL Battleground
Meet My Folks (moved from NBC)
My Thursday Night Movie
My Friday Night Movie
My Saturday Night Movie (summer)
Paradise Hotel 2 (season one on Fox)
The Best of In Living Color (moved from Fox)
The Twilight Zone (moved from UPN)

New series
The Academy
Celebrity Exposé
Control Room Presents
Decision House
Jail
Masters of Illusion
NFL Total Access
Street Patrol
Under One Roof  * 
Whacked Out Videos

Not returning from 2006–07:
American Heiress
Desire
Fashion House
Saints & Sinners
Wicked Wicked Games
Watch Over Me

NBC

Returning series
1 vs. 100
30 Rock
The Apprentice
The Biggest Loser
Deal or No Deal
ER
Friday Night Lights
Football Night in America
Heroes
Las Vegas
Last Comic Standing
Law & Order
Law & Order: Special Victims Unit
Medium
Most Outrageous Moments
My Name Is Earl
Nashville Star (moved from USA Network)
NBC Sunday Night Football
The Office
Scrubs

New series
American Gladiators *
Amnesia *
The Baby Borrowers *
Bionic Woman
Celebrity Circus *
Celebrity Family Feud *
Chuck
Clash of the Choirs 
Fear Itself *
Journeyman
Life
Lipstick Jungle *
My Dad Is Better Than Your Dad *
Phenomenon 
Quarterlife *
The Singing Bee

Not returning from 2006–07:
Andy Barker, P.I.
The Black Donnellys
Crossing Jordan
Grease: You're the One that I Want!
Identity
Kidnapped
Law & Order: Criminal Intent (moved to USA Network)
Raines
The Real Wedding Crashers
Studio 60 on the Sunset Strip
Thank God You're Here
Twenty Good Years

Full season orders and cancellations

Full season orders
The following are shows that have been given full seasons during the 2007/08 television season. Shows listed in Bold returned for the 2008/09 television season.

ABC
Private Practice – On October 19, 2007, the show was given a full 22-episode season.
Pushing Daisies – On October 23, 2007, the show received the order for nine additional episodes comprising a full season.
Samantha Who? – On October 30, 2007, the show received a full season order due to solid retention of the audience from Dancing with the Stars in both total viewers, consistently finishing 1st place in its timeslot, and the key 18-49 demographic, consistently finishing in 2nd in its timeslot.
Dirty Sexy Money – On November 16, 2007, the show was given a full season order, making it the first show to be ordered a full season since the writers strike began on November 5.

CBS
The Big Bang Theory – On October 19, 2007, the show was given a full 22-episode season.
The Unit - On October 19, 2007, the show was given a full 22-episode season order.

Fox
Kitchen Nightmares – On October 16, 2007, the show was renewed for another season of 10 episodes.
The Moment of Truth – On February 1, 2008, Fox ordered an additional 13 episodes, bringing the total episode order to 25.

NBC
Chuck– On November 26, 2007 NBC gave a full 22-episode season to the show.
Life – On November 26, 2007 NBC gave a full 22-episode season to the show.

The CW
Gossip Girl – On October 9, 2007, the show was given a full 22-episode season, making it the first new show to do so.
Aliens in America – Although a full season order has not been officially announced, sources have reported that despite the writers strike this show will have 17 episodes for the season.

Cancellations
The following are shows that have been canceled during the 2007/08 television season.

ABC
Big Shots – All 11 produced episodes aired and on February 12, 2008 ABC announced no new episodes would be produced after the strike, effectively cancelling the show.
Carpoolers – 13 produced episodes aired and on February 12, 2008 ABC announced no new episodes would be produced after the strike, effectively cancelling the show.
Cashmere Mafia – ABC announced on March 13, 2008 that the show will not return.
Cavemen – 6 of the 13 produced episodes aired, and on February 12, 2008 ABC announced no new episodes would be produced after the strike, effectively cancelling the show.
Men in Trees – ABC announced on May 4, 2008 that the show will not return next season.
Miss Guided  – Canceled on May 12, 2008
Notes from the Underbelly – Canceled on May 12, 2008
October Road – Canceled on May 12, 2008.
Women's Murder Club – Canceled on May 12, 2008.

CBS
Cane – Canceled on May 14, 2008.
Jericho – CBS announced on March 21, 2008, that the show will not return for another season.
Kid Nation – Canceled on May 14, 2008.
Moonlight – Canceled on May 14, 2008
Power of 10 – The show was canceled on April 30, 2008 in favor of The Price Is Right $1,000,000 Spectacular; the two series shared the same host (Drew Carey).
Secret Talents of the Stars – Canceled after one episode due to low ratings.
Shark - Canceled on May 14, 2008
Viva Laughlin – Canceled on October 22, 2007, after airing only two episodes. The previously unscheduled The Amazing Race started early and took over the timeslot.
Welcome to The Captain – After the 5th episode aired, the show was canceled due to poor ratings.

Fox
Canterbury's Law – Canceled on May 15, 2008.
Back to You – Canceled after Fox decided not to bring the show back for an already in-production second season.
K-Ville – 10 of the 11 produced episodes aired and on February 12, 2008, Fox announced no new episodes would be produced after the strike, effectively cancelling the show.
Nashville – Originally scheduled to return on November 9, 2007, but after airing only two episodes, Fox canceled the series on October 19, 2007.
New Amsterdam – On May 11, 2008, Fox canceled the freshman series.
The Return of Jezebel James – On March 24, 2008, after three episodes in one complete week, Fox canceled the comedy due to low ratings. It is unlikely that the unaired episodes will ever air, due to its official site being taken down by Fox.

NBC
1 vs. 100 – Canceled at the 2008 upfront presentation.
American Gladiators – NBC decided not to renew the show for a third season, even though there were plans that got canceled
Amne$ia – Canceled at the 2008 upfront presentation.
Bionic Woman – All 8 produced episodes aired and on February 12, 2008, NBC announced no new episodes would be produced after the strike, effectively cancelling the show.
My Dad Is Better Than Your Dad – Canceled at the 2008 upfront presentation.
Journeyman – The last of 13 produced episodes aired on December 19, 2007. NBC did not order a full-season run by the deadline of December 11, 2007, effectively cancelling the series.
Las Vegas – After 5 seasons and 106 episodes, NBC announced the cancellation of the series on February 20. The final episode, which aired on February 15, was a cliffhanger.
Phenomenon – Canceled at the 2008 upfront presentation.
Quarterlife – The web-series-turned-network-program was canceled on NBC after one episode due to low ratings, the lowest NBC had received in that time slot in 17 years. NBC Universal announced the series would continue on co-owned cable network Bravo.
Heroes Origins – The series was canceled before it aired and was confirmed at the upfronts.
Scrubs – After seven seasons, NBC announced that the show would not return.  However, ABC picked it up for the 2008/09 season.
The Singing Bee – Canceled at the 2008 upfront presentation.

The CW
Aliens in America – After its 18 episodes, the show will air its series finale on May 18, 2008.
Girlfriends – After 8 seasons and 172 episodes, on February 12, 2008, The CW announced no more new episodes will be produced and the show was officially canceled. While there will not be any additional episodes produced for the season, a series finale/retrospective for the show is in talks.
Life Is Wild –  All 13 produced episodes aired and on February 12, 2008, The CW announced no new episodes would be produced after the strike, effectively cancelling the show.
Online Nation – First show to be canceled in the 2007–08 season. This show set a record for the lowest ratings in The CW's brief history.
WWE Friday Night SmackDown – On February 8, 2008 World Wrestling Entertainment and The CW had ended negotiations to keep Friday Night SmackDown! on the network. WWE stated that Friday Night SmackDown! would continue to air on The CW through the end of the 2007/08 broadcast season. On February 26, 2008, WWE announced that MyNetworkTV picked up Friday Night Smackdown for the 2008/09 television season.
CW Now – It was announced that in early February, 2008, that CW Now would be going on hiatus. However, on February 13, 2008, The CW announced that they were cancelling CW Now after the February 24 episode.

Notes

References

United States primetime network television schedules
United States Network Television Schedule, 2007 08
United States Network Television Schedule, 2007 08